Robert Fry (born 1951) is a British soldier and businessman.

Robert Fry may also refer to:
Bob Fry (born 1930), former American football player
Bob Fry (golfer) (1922–1993), American golfer

See also
Robert Frye (disambiguation)
Robert Fries (1876–1966), Swedish botanist